The 14th Murray's Jat Lancers, also sometimes known as the Murray's Jat Horse, was a cavalry regiment of the British Indian Army.

The regiment was first raised at Aligarh as an irregular cavalry unit in 1857 as the Jat Horse Yeomanry, for the East India Company by Captain John Irvine Murray (later Sir John Murray) then serving with the Gwalior Contingent. It was raised from 250 sepoys and 120 sowars (cavalrymen) recruited from the Jats of the rural areas of Hathras, Mathura, Bulandshahr, Aligarh, and Khurja in UP, and Palwal and Hodal in Haryana, who were offered by Thakur Gobind Singh, a Jat chieftain of Khair in Aligarh, to combat the 1857 uprising, and thus became the first regiment to be manned completely with Jat troops in the British Indian Army. Until 1861, it was paid for by private funds of the British officers and Indian Risaldars. Later the Regimental Centre and Officers' Mess was established at Palwal. It participated in a number of actions in 1857–58, especially at Meerut, Delhi and Lucknow, but did not qualify for any battle honour. Subedar Pratap Singh was the first Subedar of the HQ Squadron of the regiment in 1857–61. Murray's Lancers subsequently served in the Bhutan Field Force.

The regiment formed part of the cavalry brigade of the Kabul Field Force during the 1878–79 Afghanistan War.  The regiment participated in a difficult cavalry charge over extremely difficult ground  and routed the Afghan line at Charasiah, 15 km from Kabul, on 6 October 1879 for which the regiment was awarded the battle honour "Charasiah" and the theatre honour "Afghanistan 1878–79".

The regiment was mentioned in despatches by General Sir Frederick Roberts, VC who wrote:

The regiment was merged in 1922 with the 15th Lancers (Cureton's Multanis) to form the 20th Lancers which was transferred to India after partition in 1947.

Designations
Like all regiments of the Indian Army the 14th Murray’s Jat Lancers underwent many name changes in the various reorganisations:
1857 The Jat Horse Yeomanry
1859 Murray’s Jat Horse
1861 14th Regiment of Bengal Cavalry
1864 14th Bengal Cavalry (Lancers)
1874 14th Bengal Lancers
1901 14th Bengal Lancers (Murray’s Jat Horse)
1903 14th Murray’s Jat Lancers
1921 Amalgamated with 15th Lancers (Cureton's Multanis) to form 14th/15th Cavalry.
1922 20th Lancers

Battle honours
The regiment has the following battle honours :
 Charasiah.
 Kabul 1879.
 Afghanistan 1878–80.
 Northwest Frontier India 1915.
 Kut-al-Amara 1917. 
 Sharqat. 
 Mesopotamia 1916–18.

In popular culture
The 14th Murray's Jat Lancers appear as (Jat Lancer) in the computer game Age of Empires III: The Asian Dynasties.

See also
 Sikh Regiment

Notes

References
Chris. Kempton: A Register of Titles of the Units of the H.E.I.C. & Indian Armies 1666-1947
John Gaylor: Sons of John Company: The Indian and Pakistan Armies 1903- 1991.
Woodward & Van Slyke: The Times History of the War: The Battlefield of Europe.

Military units and formations established in 1857
British Indian Army cavalry regiments
Honourable East India Company regiments
Jat
1857 establishments in India